Tyerman is a surname. Notable people with the surname include:

Christopher Tyerman, English historian of the Crusades
Daniel Tyerman (1773–1828), English missionary
Donald Tyerman (1908–1981), English journalist and editor
Hugo Tyerman (1880–1977), British journalist and writer